Ruslan Hanoon (born 4 March 1996) is an Iraqi footballer who plays as a defender for Al-Quwa Al-Jawiya in the Iraqi Premier League.

International career
On 24 March 2022, Hanoon made his first international cap with Iraq against United Arab Emirates in a World Cup qualifier.

References

1996 births
Living people
Iraqi footballers
Iraq international footballers
Naft Al-Wasat SC players
Association football defenders